Cassida (Crepidaspis) cognobilis, is a species of leaf beetle found in India, Sri Lanka, Laos and Thailand.

Biology
Adults are observed from Dysoxylum binecteriferum. Infection of the beetle is visible with very fine scrapings of linear fashion found on the under
surface of the leaf.

References

Cassidinae
Insects of Sri Lanka
Beetles described in 1926